Dual dating is the practice, in historical materials, to indicate some dates with what appears to be duplicate, or excessive digits, sometimes separated by a hyphen, a slash or are placed one above the other. The need for dual dating arose from the transition from an older calendar to a newer one. For example, in "10/21 February 1750/51", the dual day of the month is due to the correction for excess leap years in the Julian calendar by the Gregorian calendar, and the dual year is due to some countries beginning their numbered year on 1 January while others were still using another date. 

Another method used is to give a date of an event according to one calendar, followed in parentheses by the date of the same event in the other, suffixing an indicator to each to specify which reference calendar applies.

European countries and their colonies: Old Style and New Style dates

England, Wales, Scotland, Ireland and the American colonies

Long before the British Empire adopted the Gregorian calendar, the date of the start of the year caused difficulties. Until 1752, England, Wales, Ireland and the American colonies started the legal year on 25 March but Scotland (since 1600) and common usage started the year on 1 January. So a date such as 28 January would be near the end of a legal year but be early in the following "common" and Scottish year. It was to show this duality that the system of showing two year numbers first came into use and may be seen on memorial tablets and parish registers. Dating based on the year beginning on 25 March became known as "Annunciation Style" dates, while dates of the year  commencing on 1 January were described as "Circumcision Style'" dates, because this was the date of the Feast of the Circumcision, commemorating the eighth day of Jesus Christ's life after his birth, counted from the latter's observation on Christmas, 25 December.

From September 1752 on, England and its possessions changed both the start of the year and adopted the Gregorian calendar. Thereafter, the terms "Old Style" (OS) and "New Style" (NS) were more commonly added to dates when it proved necessary or expedient to identify which calendar is/was being used for the given date. Often, both were given for example "20 January 1708 (OS) (1709 (NS))". There may be some confusion as to which calendar alteration OS or NS refers to: the change of the start of the year, or the transition of one style of calendar to another. Historically, OS referred only to the start of the year change to 1 January from 25 March, and some historians still believe this is the best practice. However, OS and NS may refer to both alterations of the calendar:  constructions like  may be seen.

Rest of Europe
During the period between 1582, when the first countries adopted the Gregorian calendar, and 1923, when the last European country adopted it, it was often necessary to indicate the date of an event in both the Julian calendar and the Gregorian calendar.

Although the OS/NS notation was originally used only to clarify the date of events in the British Empire, the usage was reprised in more recent English-language histories of Russia, which retained the Julian calendar until 1918. For example, the beginning of the October Revolution may be recorded as 25 October [NS 7 November] 1917  (or ).

East Asia

Japan, Korea, and China started using the Gregorian calendar on 1 January 1873, 1896, and 1912, respectively. They had used lunisolar calendars previously. None of them used the Julian calendar; the Old Style and New Style dates in these countries usually mean the older lunisolar dates and the newer Gregorian calendar dates respectively. In these countries, the old style calendars were similar, but not all the same. The Arabic numerals may be used for both calendar dates in modern Japanese and Korean languages, but not Chinese.

Japan

Japan currently employs two calendar systems: Gregorian and the Japanese era name calendar. Specifically, the months and days now correspond to those of the Gregorian calendar, but the year is expressed as an offset of the era. For example, the Gregorian year 2007 corresponds to Heisei 19. An era does not necessarily begin on January 1. For example, 7 January Shōwa 64—the day of the death of Emperor Shōwa—was followed by 8 January Heisei 1, which lasted until 31 December.

Korea
Korea started using the Gregorian calendar on 1 January 1896, which was the 17th day of the 11th lunar month in not only Korea, but also in China that still used the lunisolar calendar. The lunisolar Korean calendar is now used in very limited unofficial purposes only.

China
The Republic of China started using the Gregorian calendar on 1 January 1912, but the lunisolar Chinese calendar is still used along with the Gregorian calendar, especially when determining certain traditional holidays. The reference has been a longitude of 120°E since 1929, which is also used for Chinese Standard Time (UTC+8). Mainland China, Hong Kong, Macau, Malaysia, Indonesia, Singapore and Taiwan all have legal holidays based on the lunisolar Chinese calendar, with the most important one being the Chinese New Year.

To visually distinguish old and new style dates, writing new style dates with Arabic numerals but old style dates with Chinese characters, never Arabic numerals, is the standard in Chinese publications.

In Taiwan, even though new style dates are written in Chinese characters in very formal texts, it is now common to see Arabic numerals in new style dates in less formal texts. When writing old style dates, Chinese characters are usually used, but Arabic numerals may still be seen. The calendar year in Taiwan is usually expressed as the "Year of the Republic" — counting Year 1 as the foundation of the Republic of China in 1912 CE.

Use of dates from historical documents in modern documents 

There was some confusion when calendars changed, and the confusion may continue today when evaluating historical sources. When 'translating' dates from secondary historical sources for current use, for dates in January, February and March it is advised that both year numbers be entered into modern documents until a copy of the original primary source can be checked, verifying which style was used in the 'official record'. Errors were often made in the early 19th century and have been perpetuated. 

In either case, to avoid further confusion, modern researchers are advised to be vigilant about annotating all dates with a notation indicating the Style of date, and using a slash rather than a hyphen to indicate alternate dates.

See also

 
 
 
 
 
 
International Fixed Calendar: another calendar reform proposal

References

Footnotes

Date and time representation